Old Swan is a district of Liverpool, England.

It can also refer to: 
Old Swan (ward), a local authority ward of Liverpool City Council. 
Old Swan (chief), the English language name of Ackomokki, a Native American of the Blackfoot First Nation.
Old Swan Band, an English country dance band.
Old Swan Brewery, in Perth, Western Australia.
Old Swan Hotel, in Harrogate, North Yorkshire. 
Old Swan, Rhayader, a former pub in Rhayader, Powys.